Shannon Flynn (born 22 August 1996) is an English actress and presenter from Rochdale, Greater Manchester, who is best known for appearing in Friday Download as well  as Emily James in the BBC school-based drama, Waterloo Road., and had starred in its film, Up All Night. From 2013–2015, Flynn starred in the CBBC children's show, Dani's Castle.Career
Flynn's acting career began in 2008 with some small roles in theatre productions. In 2009, she joined the cast of the BBC One drama Waterloo Road as Emily James alongside Jenna-Louise Coleman.

In 2012, she was cast in the CBBC children's television programme Dani's Castle alongside Dani Harmer. The show began airing in 2013 and a second series began airing in 2014. The show was renewed for a third series which was filmed in 2014 and began airing on 7 July 2015.

In 2012, she made her first appearance on the CBBC children's entertainment show Friday Download as a guest presenter, and in 2013 she joined the main presenting team. In 2014, she was cast in the Friday Download movie Up All Night. Filming began on 6 September 2014. Up All Night will be released on 22 May 2015.

On 14 April 2015, Flynn announced that she would not be returning for the ninth series of Friday Download.

On 4 March 2016, Flynn began playing Lauren, the bully of Bethany Platt (Lucy Fallon) in the long-running ITV soap opera, Coronation Street''. Her final appearance as Lauren was broadcast on 30 September 2016.

Filmography

Television

Radio

Theatre

References

External links

1996 births
Living people
English child actresses
Actors from Rochdale
English television actresses
English radio actresses
English soap opera actresses
Actresses from Greater Manchester